The karate tournament at the 2009 Mediterranean Games was held in the FEPO Sports Hall from June 30 to July 1, 2009, in Pescara, Italy.

Medalists

Men's competition

Women's competition

Medal table 

Sports at the 2009 Mediterranean Games
2009
2009 in karate